Lecitholaxa thiodora is a species of moth of the family Lecithoceridae. It is found in Taiwan, China (from south to north), Japan, Korea and India.

The wingspan is 13–14 mm.

External links
Lecithoceridae (Lepidoptera) of Taiwan (II): Subfamily Lecithocerinae: Genus Lecithocera Herrich-Schäffer and Its Allies

thiodora
Moths of Japan
Moths described in 1914